"Love's Contagious" is the fifth single from freestyle singer George Lamond's debut album Bad of the Heart.

Track listing

 US 12" Single

Charts

References

1991 singles
George Lamond songs
Song recordings produced by Chris Barbosa